Mathew St. Patrick (born March 17, 1969) is an American actor best known for his portrayal of Keith Charles on the HBO drama series Six Feet Under (2001−05). Previously, Patrick appeared as Marcus Taggert in General Hospital (1997) and Adrian Sword in All My Children (1998−2000), both soap operas. St. Patrick also had a leading role as Detective Kenneth Marjorino in short-lived series Reunion (2005−06). His film roles include War (2007) and Alien Raiders (2008).

Early life
St. Patrick was born and raised in Philadelphia, Pennsylvania, the son of Curtis St. Patrick, a hot dog vendor, and Brenda (née Queen), who taught grade school. He was on the varsity track team of Olney High School, but graduated in 1986 from Scotland School for Veterans' Children in Scotland, Pennsylvania, the last remaining school for children of military veterans in the United States.

After graduating from high school, he lived in New York and then for eight years in Chicago, Illinois, where he worked a wide variety of jobs: delivery salesman for Coca-Cola, at UPS, a furniture store, and for the Union Pacific Railroad.

Acting career
In 1994, St. Patrick moved to Los Angeles, California to begin his acting career. In Los Angeles, he first worked as a personal trainer then in 1996 joined the West Coast Theater Ensemble. After acting in his first stage production, Full Court Press, an agent noticed him and cast St. Patrick in the latter's film debut, Steel Sharks (1997), playing a Navy serviceman.

St. Patrick was cast as Detective Marcus Taggert on soap opera General Hospital in 1997, replacing Réal Andrews in the role. However, his time in the role was brief, and Andrews returned as Marcus in 1998. St. Patrick was not satisfied with Marcus' character, describing him as "one-dimensional." He joined another soap opera, All My Children, as police lieutenant Adrian Sword, appearing in the series until 2000. For his performance as Adrian, St. Patrick received two NAACP Image Award nominations for Outstanding Actor in a Daytime Drama Series, in 1999 and 2000.

He made guest appearances on Beverly Hills, 90210, Diagnosis: Murder, NYPD Blue and Crossing Jordan. St. Patrick landed the role of Keith Charles in the HBO series Six Feet Under in 2001, portraying a gay black man in an interracial relationship with David Fisher (Michael C. Hall). Alongside his Six Feet Under cast members, St. Patrick was nominated five consecutive times for the Screen Actors Guild Award for Outstanding Performance by an Ensemble in a Drama Series (2001−05), winning the award in 2002 and 2003. St. Patrick continued playing Keith until the series ended in 2005.

St. Patrick starred as Detective Marjorino in the Fox drama series Reunion, which ran from 2005 to 2006. Additionally, he played an FBI agent in the film War (2007) and Seth in the science fiction horror film Alien Raiders (2008). St. Patrick voiced an EMT in the "Mr. Mathers" skit featured on Eminem's album Relapse (2009). He was the first voice of Skulker on Danny Phantom (2004) and did voice work in preschool series Higglytown Heroes (2005−06).

Following the end of Six Feet Under, most of St. Patrick's roles on television have been minor characters. He appeared in the pilot of the TV series NCIS: Los Angeles (2013) and guest starred on Law & Order: Special Victims Unit (2006),  Private Practice (2009) and Hawaii Five-0 (2017). St. Patrick had a recurring role during the final season of the award-winning FX drama Sons of Anarchy (2014), as Moses Cartwright.

Personal life
St. Patrick has a son, and reads the bible regularly.

Filmography

References

External links

Six Feet Under - Official website
All My Children - Official website

1969 births
American male film actors
Living people
Male actors from Philadelphia
American male soap opera actors
20th-century American male actors
21st-century American male actors
African-American male actors
American male television actors
20th-century African-American people
21st-century African-American people